The Campeonato Goiano - Terceira Divisão, is the third division of the football league of the state of Goiás, Brazil.

Clubs 

Following is the list with the participants of all recent editions of the tournament:

List of champions

Notes

Formosa EC has changed to Campeonato Brasiliense, due to the proximity of Formosa and Brasília.

Titles by team 

Teams in bold still active.

By city

References

External links 

FGF Official Website
RSSSF

State football leagues in Brazil
Campeonato Goiano